Morocco first participated at the Youth Olympic Games at the inaugural 2010 Games in Singapore. Morocco has sent a team to each Summer Youth Olympic Games and participated for the first and so far the only time at the Winter Youth Olympic Games in the 2012 edition held in Innsbruck. Moroccan athletes have won 9 medals at the Summer Youth Games and 1 at the Winter Youth Games, winning Africa's first ever medal at a Winter sport competition.

Medal tables

Medals by Summer Youth Games

Medals by Winter Youth Games

Medals by Summer Sports

Medals by Winter Sports

List of medalists

Summer Games

Winter Games

See also 
 Morocco at the Olympics
 Morocco at the Paralympics

References 

 
2018 in Moroccan sport
Nations at the 2018 Summer Youth Olympics